Purple Rain is the sixth studio album by American singer, songwriter, producer, and multi-instrumentalist Prince. It was released on June 25, 1984, by Warner Bros. Records, as the soundtrack album to the 1984 film of the same name. Purple Rain was musically denser than Prince's previous albums, emphasizing full band performances, and multiple layers of guitars, keyboards, electronic synthesizer effects, drum machines, and other instruments.

Much of the album had a grandiose, synthesized, and psychedelic sheen to the production and performances. The music on Purple Rain is generally regarded as the most pop-oriented of Prince's career, though a number of elements point towards the more experimental records Prince would release after Purple Rain. The music video for the album's lead single "When Doves Cry" sparked controversy among network executives, who thought its sexual nature was too explicit for television. The risqué lyrics of "Darling Nikki" raised complaints from Tipper Gore and the Parents Music Resource Center and contributed to the implementation of Parental Advisory stickers and imprints on album covers.

Purple Rain became Prince's first album to reach number one on the Billboard 200. The album spent 24 consecutive weeks atop on the Billboard 200 and was present on the chart for a total of 122 weeks. "When Doves Cry" and "Let's Go Crazy" reached number one on the Billboard Hot 100, while "Purple Rain" peaked at number two and "I Would Die 4 U" peaked at number eight. In May 1996, the album was certified 13× Platinum by the Recording Industry Association of America (RIAA). It is Prince's commercial peak, with total sales standing at 25 million copies worldwide, making it one of the best-selling albums of all time. Prince and the Revolution won Grammy Awards for Best Rock Performance by a Duo or Group with Vocal and Best Score Soundtrack for Visual Media, while Prince also won the Academy Award for Best Original Song Score for the film Purple Rain.

Music critics noted the innovative and experimental aspects of the soundtrack's music, most famously on the spare, bass-less "When Doves Cry". Other aspects of the music, especially its synthesis of electronic elements with organic instrumentation and full-band performances along with its consolidation of rock and R&B, were identified by critics as distinguishing, even experimental factors. Purple Rain is regularly ranked among the greatest albums of all time. Rolling Stone ranked the album number eight on its list of the 500 Greatest Albums of All Time. It was inducted into the Grammy Hall of Fame and added to the Library of Congress' National Recording Registry list of sound recordings that are "culturally, historically, or aesthetically significant".

Background

While Prince's previous albums were primarily solo recordings by Prince, Purple Rain contained the credits "produced, arranged, composed and performed by Prince and the Revolution", though he had teased the name two years earlier on 1999, writing "and the Revolution" backwards on the album cover. The album was mostly recorded between August 1983 and March 1984, the exception being "Baby I'm a Star", composed and demoed in early December  1981. The last three songs on the album ("I Would Die 4 U", "Baby I'm A Star" and the title track "Purple Rain") were recorded live at the 3August 1983 First Avenue show in Minneapolis, although overdubs and edits took place on all three in September 1983; this marked Prince's first album to include live recordings.

Regarding the meaning of "Purple Rain", both Mikel Toombs of The San Diego Union and Bob Kostanczuk of the Post-Tribune have written that Prince took the title "Purple Rain" from lyrics in the America song "Ventura Highway". Asked to explain the phrase "purple rain" in "Ventura Highway", Gerry Beckley responded: "You got me." However, Prince explained the meaning of "Purple Rain" as follows: "When there's blood in the skyred and blue = purple... purple rain pertains to the end of the world and being with the one you love and letting your faith/god guide you through the purple rain." 

"Purple Rain" was originally written as a country song and intended to be a collaboration with Stevie Nicks. According to Nicks, she received a 10-minute instrumental version of the song from Prince with a request to write the lyrics, but felt overwhelmed. She said: "I listened to it and I just got scared. I called him back and said, 'I can't do it. I wish I could. It's too much for me.'" At a rehearsal, Prince then asked his backing band to try the song: "I want to try something before we go home. It's mellow." According to the Revolution member Lisa Coleman, Prince then changed the song after the Revolution's Wendy Melvoin started playing guitar chords to accompany the song: "He was excited to hear it voiced differently. It took it out of that country feeling. Then we all started playing it a bit harder and taking it more seriously. We played it for six hours straight and by the end of that day we had it mostly written and arranged."

"Take Me with U" was written for the Apollonia 6 album Apollonia6 (1984), but later enlisted for Purple Rain. The inclusion of that song necessitated cuts to the suite-like "Computer Blue", the full version of which did not earn an official release, although a portion of the second section can be heard in the film of the same name, in a sequence where Prince walks in on the men of the Revolution rehearsing. The risqué lyrics of "Darling Nikki" contributed to the use of Parental Advisory stickers and imprints on album covers that were the record label's answer to complaints from Tipper Gore and the Parents Music Resource Center (PMRC).

Prince wrote and composed the album's lead single "When Doves Cry" after all the other tracks were complete on Purple Rain. In addition to providing vocals, he played all instruments on the track. With there being no bass line, the song's production is noted for being unconventionally bare in comparison to 1980s pop hits. Prince said there originally was a bass line but, after a conversation with singer Jill Jones, he decided the song was too conventional with it included.

Composition
Like Prince's previous albums, nearly all tracks on Purple Rain were written by him. Purple Rain was musically denser than Prince's previous albums, emphasizing full band performances, and multiple layers of guitars, keyboards, electronic synthesizer effects, drum machines, and other instruments. As a soundtrack record, much of the music had a grandiose, synthesized, and evenby some evaluationsa psychedelic sheen to the production and performances. The music on Purple Rain is generally regarded as the most pop-oriented of Prince's career, though a number of elements point towards the more experimental records Prince would release after Purple Rain. Apollonia6 member Apollonia recalled that after watching the Purple Rain cinematographic takes, she told Prince, "You know you're going to get an Oscar for this movienot for the acting, but for the music."

The Revolution member Doctor Fink told PopMatters in 2009 the recording of the album was "a very creative time... There was a lot of influence and input from band members towards what [Prince] was doing. He was always open to anybody trying to contribute creatively to the process of writing... But Prince was the main lyricist and melody maker for all the songs... and never took any lyrical content from people." Melvoin told Mojo in 1997 the band members were "absolute musical equals in the sense that Prince respected us, and allowed us to contribute to the music without any interference... I think the secret to our working relationship was that we were very non-possessive about our ideas, as opposed to some other people that have worked with him."

Revolution members Fink, Coleman, and Melvoin helped write the album's fourth track "Computer Blue". Doctor Fink, who wrote a keyboard bass line for the track, said he "started playing that main bass groove which later became 'Computer Blue'. So the band [the Revolution] started grooving on it, and Prince started coming up with some stuff, then we recorded a rough version and he took it into the studio and just incorporated it all and made it fly that way. Wendy [Melovin] and Lisa [Coleman] did some of the stuff on it. Prince borrowed the bridge/portal section from the then-unreleased Father's Song, by his father [jazz musician John L. Nelson], who had given him some music over the years to play around with. So the song was a real mixture of different people and influences."

The full band appears on five tracks: "Let's Go Crazy", "Computer Blue", "I Would Die 4 U", "Baby I'm A Star" and "Purple Rain" while the remainder of the tracks are essentially solo performances by Prince. Apollonia sings co-lead on "Take Me WithU". Three of the tracks include a string section arranged by Coleman and Prince which were conducted by Coleman and Melvoin: "Take Me WithU", "Baby I'm A Star", and "Purple Rain". The string players are violin and viola player Novi Novog and cellists David Coleman and Suzie Katayama.

Early configurations
Prince configured at least two unique track listings of Purple Rain prior to setting the final running order. November 7, 1983 and March 23, 1984, configurations are listed below. The early configuration included "Wednesday" (a song by Prince with Jill Jones) and "Father's Song". The latter was replaced by "When Doves Cry". Edits to "Let's Go Crazy" and "Computer Blue" were introduced in order to include "Take Me withU" in the final running configuration. The full length version of "Let's Go Crazy", as it can be seen in the movie, would later be released as "Special Dance Mix" on 12" maxi-single.

November 7, 1983 configuration
 Side one
 "Let's Go Crazy"  – 7:37
 "The Beautiful Ones"
 "Computer Blue"  – 7:23
 "Darling Nikki"
 "Wednesday"
 Side two
 "Purple Rain"
 "I Would Die 4 U"
 "Baby I'm a Star"
 "Father's Song"

March 23, 1984 configuration
 Side one
 "Let's Go Crazy"  – 7:37
 "The Beautiful Ones" – 5:15
 "Computer Blue"  – 7:23
 "Darling Nikki" – 4:15
 Side two
 "When Doves Cry" – 5:52
 "I Would Die 4 U" – 2:51
 "Baby I'm a Star" – 4:20
 "Purple Rain" – 8:45

Promotion

Artwork
The album cover was photographed at the Warner Bros Studio Backlot in California. The area known as Hennesy St, designed to look like a New York tenement area, was the location of the balcony where the album photo was taken.

Tour

The Purple Rain Tour began at the Joe Louis Arena in Detroit in November 1984. In addition to Prince and the Revolution, the Purple Rain Tour featured Apollonia6, and Sheila E. and her band. The tour opened with the album's opener, "Let's Go Crazy". Three singles from 1999 (1982) followed: "Delirious", "1999" and "Little Red Corvette". An instrumental interlude of "Yankee Doodle" usually introduced another song from 1999, "Free". The B-side "God" was often played, followed by a usual sequence of "Computer Blue", "Darling Nikki", "The Beautiful Ones" and "When Doves Cry". As encores, the remaining Purple Rain songs closed the concert, "I Would Die 4 U", "Baby I'm a Star" and "Purple Rain". 

The tour spanned 98 shows, ending in April 1985, and sold 1.7 million tickets. Prince and the Revolution played the final date of the tour, to an audience of 55,000 in Miami's Orange Bowl. Prince ended the show saying, "I have to go now. I don't know when I'll be back. I want you to know that God loves you. He loves us all." Two weeks after the end of the tour, Around the World in a Day (1985) was released, which officially brought an end to Prince's Purple Rain era. The tour was considered by Rolling Stone as "groundbreaking in many ways" because it introduced Prince's most "elaborate" sets and featured occasional cameos from Bruce Springsteen and Madonna, which confirmed Prince's place as "pop's most commanding star" during the Purple Rain era.

Singles
Purple Rain's lead single "When Doves Cry" was Prince's first Billboard Hot 100 number-one single, staying there for five weeks, and was also a worldwide hit. It was ranked number one on the Billboard Year-End Hot 100 singles of 1984. The music video, directed by Prince himself, was premiered on MTV in June 1984. The video sparked controversy among network executives, who thought its sexual nature was too explicit for television.

The second single "Let's Go Crazy" became Prince's second number-one hit on the Billboard Hot 100. Common to much of Prince's writing, the song is thought to be exhortation to follow Christian ethics, with the "De-elevator" of the lyrics being a metaphor for the Devil.

A power ballad and a combination of rock, R&B, gospel, and orchestral music, "Purple Rain" reached number2 on the Billboard Hot 100 and stayed there for two weeks. 
"I Would Die 4 U", the fourth and final Billboard Hot 100 top 10 hit from Purple Rain, reaching number eight on the chart. The album's final single, "Take Me withU", was released on January 25, 1985.

Critical reception

Purple Rain was well received by contemporary critics. Kurt Loder, writing for Rolling Stone in 1984, compared Prince to Jimi Hendrix and praised him for merging "black and white styles": "The spirit of Jimi Hendrix must surely smile down on Prince Rogers Nelson. Like Hendrix, Prince seems to have tapped into some extraterrestrial musical dimension where black and white styles are merely different aspects of the same funky thing. Prince's rock & roll is as authentic and compelling as his soul and his extremism is endearing in a era of play-it-safe record production and formulaic hit mongering."

At the end of 1984, Purple Rain was voted the second best album of the year in the Pazz & Jop, an annual poll of American critics nationwide, published by The Village Voice. However, the newspaper's chief critic and poll creator Robert Christgau was less impressed by the album, saying that while it is "quirky, dangerous, [and] unabashedly pop", it is also plagued by "despair" and, "for Prince ... ingratiatingly unsolipsistic", although he would later call it "seriously gorgeous".

Prince and the Revolution won a 1984 Grammy Award for Purple Rain, for Best Rock Vocal Performance by a Duo or Group with Vocal, the four composers (Nelson, Coleman, Prince, and Melvoin) won Best Score Soundtrack for Visual Media, and the album was nominated for Album of the Year. Prince won a third Grammy that year for Best R&B Song for Chaka Khan's cover of "I Feel for You". Purple Rain also won an Oscar for Best Original Song Score in 1985. Purple Rain posthumously won Top Soundtrack at the American Music Awards in 2016.

Retrospective appraisals have also been positive. Music critics noted the innovative and experimental aspects of the soundtrack's music, most famously on the spare, bass-less "When Doves Cry". Other aspects of the music, especially its synthesis of electronic elements with organic instrumentation and full-band performances (some, as noted above, recorded live) along with its landmark consolidation of rock and R&B, were identified by critics as distinguishing, even experimental factors.

Stephen Erlewine of AllMusic wrote that Purple Rain finds Prince "consolidating his funk and R&B roots while moving boldly into pop, rock, and heavy metal", as well as "push[ing] heavily into psychedelia" under the influence of the Revolution. Erlewine identifies the record's nine songs as "uncompromising ... forays into pop" and "stylistic experiments", echoing general sentiment that Purple Rains music represented Prince at his most popular without forsaking his experimental bent. In a retrospective review, Kenneth Partridge, writing for Billboard, described the album's opening track, "Let's Go Crazy", as "arguably the best intro in pop history".

Commercial performance
In the United States, Purple Rain debuted at number 11 on the Billboard 200 the week of July 14, 1984. After four weeks on chart, it reached number one on August 4, 1984. The album spent 24 consecutive weeks at number one on the Billboard 200 from August 4, 1984, to January 18, 1985, and more than 32 weeks in the top 10, becoming one of the most successful soundtracks ever. Prince also joined Elvis Presley and the Beatles in being the only artists to have the number-one album, single and film in the US all at the same time. 

It traded the number-one position on the chart with Bruce Springsteen's Born in the U.S.A. twice, during 1984 and 1985. Purple Rain was present on the Billboard 200 for one hundred twenty two weeks. After the advent of the Nielsen SoundScan era in 1991, the album sold a further three million copies. By 1996, the album had sold 13 million copies in the United States, making it certified 13× Platinum by the Recording Industry Association of America (RIAA).

In the United Kingdom, Purple Rain entered the UK Albums Chart at number 21 on July 21, 1984, after thirty five weeks on the chart it reached and peaked at number seven during the week of March 16, 1985 and stayed there for a week, it fell off to number twelve the next week. The album remained on the chart for 86 weeks. It was certified 2× Platinum by the BPI on May 1, 1990, denoting shipments of 600,000 units. By 1988, Purple Rain had sold 17 million copies worldwide making it one of the most successful albums of the 1980s. Its sales as of 2008 stood at over 25million copies worldwide. The album is also multi-platinum in Australia, Canada, New Zealand and the United Kingdom.

Legacy and influence
Purple Rain further established Prince as a figurehead for pop music of the 1980s and is regarded as one of the greatest albums of all time. In 2010, Purple Rain was inducted into the Grammy Hall of Fame. In 2012, the album was added to the Library of Congress's National Recording Registry list of sound recordings that "are culturally, historically, or aesthetically important". In 2019, the film was selected by the Library of Congress for preservation in the United States National Film Registry for being "culturally, historically, or aesthetically significant". 

Jon Bon Jovi, lead singer of the rock band Bon Jovi, observed that "There's every emotion [in Purple Rain] from the ballad to the rocker" and "All the influences were evident, from Hendrix to Chic." Lionel Richie praised Prince for making a "very important step" in advancing the concept from creating music videos for songs to making a motion picture for an album. Partridge of Billboard emphasized Prince's popularity during the Purple Rain era, writing,

Described as a "masterpiece" by the Grammy Awards, Ana Yglesias wrote, "Even after his heartbreaking passing, Prince will live on forever in our hearts, through his music, and even on the charts. Purple Rain was inducted into Grammy Hall of Fame in 2011, celebrating it as a 'recording of lasting qualitative or historical significance'.... It is safe to say there will never be another star quite like Prince." 

For The New Yorker, Ben Greenmane wrote, "Purple Rain may or may not be Prince's best record, but it came at the best time, propelling him from ordinary stardom (his previous album 1999 put three singles into the Billboard top 20) to supernova status. It created his iconic look (ruffled shirt, purple jacket, motorcycle), formally introduced his most famous backing band (the Revolution), and included the lion's share of the songs most likely to appear in a capsule bio ('When Doves Cry', 'Let's Go Crazy', and the title track)." In Rolling Stone's list of The 25 Greatest Soundtracks of All Time, Purple Rain was described as "an epic celebration of everything rock & roll, which means sex and religion and eyeliner and motorcycles and guitars and Lake Minnetonka". 

Chris Gerard wrote for PopMatters that "Purple Rain is one of the cornerstone albums not just of the 80s, but in all of pop/rock history... at the core of [Prince's] legacy Purple Rain will always stand as his signature triumph, a monument to his boundless talent and ambition." Gerard also praised "When Doves Cry" for being the "gateway" to the "Purple Rain universe: an album, a major motion picture, and a tour that dominated the pop culture landscape of 1984".

Andrew Unterberger of Billboard gave the album high appraisal, regarding it as one of the greatest albums in popular music: "Purple Rain is certainly in contention for the most perfect album in rock or pop history, expertly flowing from track to track while delighting, surprising and astounding at each bend. Personal and universal, familiar and challenging, romantic and narcissistic, religious and orgasmic, accessible to all and profoundly weird, Purple Rain rightly remains the cornerstone of Prince's recorded legacy, almost too obvious in its brilliance to even be worth discussing at length." 

Writing for Pitchfork, Carvell Wallace appraised the album's impact and Prince's musicianship, "With Purple Rain, Prince bursts forth from the ghetto created by mainstream radio and launches himself directly onto the Mt. Rushmore of American music. He plays rock better than rock musicians, composes better than jazz guys, and performs better than everyone, all without ever abandoning his roots as a funk man, a party leader, a true MC... for the 24 weeks Purple Rain spent atop the charts in 1984, the black kid from the midwest had managed to become the most accurate expression we had of young America's overabundance of angst, love, horniness, recklessness, idealism, and hope."

Accolades
Purple Rain is regarded as one of the greatest albums of all time by numerous publications. Rolling Stone ranked Purple Rain number two on its list of the 100 Best Albums of the 1980s and number eight on its list of the 500 Greatest Albums of All Time. In their list of The 25 Greatest Soundtracks of All Time, Purple Rain was ranked 2nd, behind the Beatles' Help!. Time included it in its list of the All-TIME 100 Albums. The album was ranked 18th on VH1's Greatest Rock and Roll Albums of All Time countdown. The Times ranked Purple Rain at number 15 on its list of the 100 Best Albums of All Time. 

In 2007, the editors of Vanity Fair labeled it the best soundtrack of all time, and Tempo magazine named it the greatest album of the 1980s. In 2008, Entertainment Weekly ranked Purple Rain at number one on their list of the Top 100 Best Albums of the Previous 25 years. The album was included in the 1001 Albums You Must Hear Before You Die. In 2012, Slant Magazine ranked the album at number two on its list of Best Albums of the 1980s. In 2013, Entertainment Weekly also ranked the album at number two on their list of the 100 Greatest Albums Ever. 

Pitchfork regarded it as the best album of the 1980s, ranking it at number one on its list of The 200 Best Albums of the 1980s (sixteen years prior it placed at No. 12 on that website's Top 100 Albums of the decade list). In Billboard's list of All 92 Diamond-Certified Albums Ranked From Worst to Best: Critic's Take, Purple Rain was ranked first. According to Acclaimed Music, it is the 47th most celebrated album in popular music history.

Reissues
The album was re-issued on June 23, 2017. It is the first Prince album to be remastered and reissued, and was released in a variety of formats, including a 20-track Deluxe edition with unreleased bonus tracks and a 35-track Deluxe Expanded edition with additional B-sides, rarities and a live DVD of the Purple Rain Tour from 1985. The album debuted at number four on the Billboard 200 at with 52,000 album-equivalent units earned in its first week. It debuted at number three on the Top R&B/Hip-Hop Albums chart, its highest peak in 32 years having previously spent 19 weeks atop the chart in 1984. The album debuted at number one on the Top R&B Albums chart and the Vinyl Albums chart.

Track listing

Original album

Deluxe and expanded editions
The 2017 Deluxe edition consists of two discs, the first being a remaster of the original album made in 2015 overseen by Prince himself and a bonus disc of previously unreleased songs called "From the Vault & Previously Unreleased". The Deluxe Expanded edition consists of two more discs, a disc with all the single edits, maxi-single edits and B-sides from the Purple Rain era and a DVD with a concert from the Purple Rain Tour filmed in Syracuse, New York on March 30, 1985, previously released on home video in 1985.

Personnel
Information taken from the Prince Vault website.

Musicians 
 Prince – lead vocals, background vocals, lead guitar, piano and various instruments except where noted
 Bobby Z. – drums and percussion (1–2, 4, 7–9)
 Brown Mark – bass guitar and vocals (1–2, 4, 7–9)
 Wendy Melvoin – guitar and vocals (1–2, 4, 7–9)
 Lisa Coleman – keyboards and vocals (1–2, 4, 7–9)
 Matt Fink – keyboards and vocals (1–2, 4, 7–9)
 Apollonia – co-lead vocals (2)
 David Coleman – cello (2, 8–9)
 Novi Novog – violin and viola (2, 8–9)
 Suzie Katayama – cello (2, 8–9)
 Jill Jones – additional background vocals (8)

Production 

 Prince - producer and arranger, clothing (credited for "rags"), art direction
 David Leonard - engineer (The Warehouse, St. Louis Park, MN, USA; Sunset Sound, Hollywood, CA, USA; First Avenue, Minneapolis, MN, USA and Record Plant Remote - Mobile Truck (from New York, NY in Minneapolis, MN USA)
 Susan Rogers - engineer (The Warehouse, St. Louis Park, MN, USA)
 Peggy McCreary - engineer (Sunset Sound, Hollywood, CA, USA)
 David Rivkin - engineer (First Avenue, Minneapolis, MN, USA in Record Plant Remote - Mobile Truck (from New York, NY, USA)
 Bernie Grundman - mastering
 Laura LiPuma - design
 Ed Thrasher and Associates - front cover photograph
 Ron Slenzak - front cover photograph
 Larry Williams - additional photography
 Doug Henders - painting
 Earl Jones - hair
 Jayson Jeffreys - makeup
 Louis & Vaughn - clothing (credited for "rags")
 Marie France - clothing (credited for "rags")

Charts

Weekly charts

Year-end charts

Certifications and sales

See also

 List of Billboard 200 number-one albums of 1984
 List of Billboard 200 number-one albums of 1985
 List of best-selling albums
 List of best-selling albums in the United States
 List of fastest-selling albums

References

External links

1984 soundtrack albums
1984 albums
Prince (musician) soundtracks
Prince (musician) albums
Albums produced by Prince (musician)
Warner Records albums
Warner Records soundtracks
Drama film soundtracks
Musical film soundtracks
Dance-rock soundtracks
Visual albums
Grammy Hall of Fame Award recipients
United States National Recording Registry recordings
Albums recorded at Sunset Sound Recorders
Single-artist film soundtracks
United States National Recording Registry albums
Scores that won the Best Original Score Academy Award